The 6ixth Session is a drum and bass compilation album mixed by Dieselboy, and included for the first time a second unmixed CD of complete original tracks. It was released by Palm Pictures on March 28, 2000. The 6ixth Session featured a cyborg-themed mix described by the Washington Post as “hard-edged hyperdriven dance music.”  This project marked the beginning of Dieselboy’s VIP remix phase. The cover is a CGI generated image of the side of a robot's head.

Track listing 
Disc One
"Initialize" - Dieselboy vs. Atlantiq
"The Messiah" - Kemal & Rob Data
"Heavy Metal" - Technical Itch
"Nanobugs" - Signal to Noise
"Bios Fear" - Underfire vs. Negative
"Homicide" - Future Cut & Futurebound
"Shrapnel (Stakka & Skynet Remix)" - Usual Suspects
"Firewire" - Andy C & Shimon
"Toxin" - Bad Company 
"Invid (E-Sassin VIP)" - Dieselboy
"The Descent (Phunckateck VIP) - Dieselboy
"Pusher" - Technical Itch
"Eclipse" - Loxy & Dylan
"Plimsoul VIP" - Facs & B-Key
"Space Age Remix" - Teebee
"Dominion" - Dylan
"Solarize" - J Majik

Disc Two
 Dieselboy  - 	 Invid
 Dieselboy  - 	 Render
 Dieselboy  - 	 The Descent	
 Dieselboy  - 	 Invid (E-Sassin VIP)
 Dieselboy  - 	 The Descent (Phunckateck VIP)

External links
 
 The 6ixth Session at PalmPictures.com
 Official site

Dieselboy albums
2000 compilation albums